Tribhuvan University Teachers' Association (TUTA), an organization of teachers at the Tribhuvan University, in Kathmandu, Nepal.

In order to bring the Tribhuvan University teachers out of them with their perspectives, TUTA University campus unit had initiated the publication of its journal Perspectives on Higher Education in 2002 . Five volumes of this journal, though sporadically, have already been published.

Prof. Dr. Krishna Prasad Ghimire was the secretary of TUTA.

Education-related professional associations
Tribhuvan University
Teaching in Nepal